Bhatika Tissa was King of Anuradhapura in the 2nd century, whose reign lasted from 141 to 165. He succeeded his father Mahallaka Naga as King of Anuradhapura and was succeeded by his brother Kanittha Tissa.

See also
 List of Sri Lankan monarchs
 History of Sri Lanka

References

External links
 Kings & Rulers of Sri Lanka
 Codrington's Short History of Ceylon

B
B
B
B